King Donovan (January 25, 1918 – June 30, 1987) was an American film, stage, and television actor, as well as a film and television director.

Early years
Francis King Donovan was born in Manhattan on January 25, 1918. His parents were vaudevillians who traveled nationwide in the United States, and at three weeks of age he began traveling with them. He attended Mt. Joseph School in Buffalo, New York through eighth grade, after which he went to work. His acting debut occurred in his teenage years at the Butler Davenport Theater.

Acting work

Radio 
Donovan worked in radio before serving in the Air Force for three years. After he left the military, he returned to radio and worked on stage on the West Coast.

Film
Donovan's film debut occurred in The Man from Texas (1947). His film acting work includes Jack in the original Invasion of the Body Snatchers (a role later reprised by Jeff Goldblum in the 1978 version), Solly in The Defiant Ones, Joe Capper in Cowboy, Mack McGee in the original Angels in the Outfield, Major Collins in The Perfect Furlough, and an uncredited but recognizable role in Singin' in the Rain as Rod (head of the Publicity Department). Donovan left the film industry in the late 1950s because, he said, he hated "about 90 percent of what I was doing".

Stage
Donovan was part of the Jitney Players traveling troupe in the 1940s. He performed with the Hendrickson Shakespearean Company for two years, and he appeared in The Male Animal for the USO. In 1948, Donovan appeared on Broadway in The Vigil (1948), The Girls in 509 (1958) and Morning's at Seven (1980). In 1968, he toured with his wife Imogene Coca in a productions of You Know I Can't Hear You When the Water's Running" and "Once upon a Mattress".

Television
Notable television roles include Jake Clampett (a deadbeat who mooches off the Clampetts) for two episodes of CBS's The Beverly Hillbillies, Blanche Morton's (Bea Benaderet's) brother Roger Baker on eight episodes of The George Burns and Gracie Allen Show, and Harvey Helm in a 17-episode stint on NBC's The Bob Cummings Show.  Donovan also appeared in six episodes as Chris Norman of It's a Great Life.  About this time, he also guest starred on Ray Bolger's ABC sitcom, Where's Raymond? and the NBC sitcom, The People's Choice, with Jackie Cooper.  He also guest starred on the crime drama, Richard Diamond, Private Detective.  In 1956 he appeared as Joe Baker on the TV western Cheyenne in the episode titled "Mustang Trail."  He also played in a 1960 episode of Shotgun Slade.  He played a petty thief Name Baxter who stole from an orphanage. He portrayed Marty in "Academy Award," a 1957 episode of the CBS situation comedy Mr. Adams and Eve. He played Mark Dawson in the 1959 Maverick episode "Maverick Springs".  He was also in Wanted: Dead or Alive in the 1959 episode "Bad Gun" as the gun dealer Sheridan Appleby. In the 1963 episode "The Clampetts Go Hollywood", King Donovan portrays Jake Clampett.   
 He played Twirly Boggs in the 1960 TV series Bonanza, season 1 episode 19 'The Gunmen'. https://www.imdb.com/title/tt0529733/characters/nm0233014?ref_=ttfc_fc_cl_t8

Donovan guest starred as Paddy Britt in the 1959 episode "The Boy from Pittsburgh" of the NBC western series, Riverboat.

In 1963, he played the part of Poke Tolliver in the episode "Incident of the Buryin' Man" on CBS's Rawhide. Between 1965 and 1967, Donovan had a recurring role as neighbor Herb---whose mission in life seemed to be getting from his house through the study window of professor Jim Nash in less than a full minute---on the situation comedy Please Don't Eat the Daisies.

Directing work
In 1963 Donovan directed the film Promises! Promises!, which received attention as the first Hollywood sound film to feature a mainstream film star (Jayne Mansfield) nude. Later the same year Donovan directed two episodes of Grindl, which starred his wife Imogene Coca and two more the next year.

Personal life and death

Previously married and the father of three children, Donovan married actress/ comedian Imogene Coca on October 17, 1960. They remained married until his death from cancer on June 30, 1987, aged 69, in the Connecticut Hospice in Branford, Connecticut.

Filmography

Donovan filmed scenes for an undetermined role in the 1949 film I Was a Male War Bride'', but his scenes were deleted.

References

External links
 
 
 
 

1918 births
1987 deaths
American male film actors
American male stage actors
American male television actors
American television directors
Male actors from New York City
People from Manhattan
Male actors from Los Angeles
Deaths from cancer in Connecticut
20th-century American male actors
Film directors from New York City